Mario Satz (full natural name: Mario Norberto Satz Tetelbaum) is a Spanish language poet, novelist, essayist and translator, who became famous in Spanish literary circles as a lecturer and seminar leader.

He was born in the district of Coronel Pringles, in the Province of Buenos Aires in 1944, within a family of Jewish origin. After completing high school in Argentina, made long journeys through South America, USA and Europe. Between 1970 and 1973 lived in Jerusalem, studying the Jewish Kabbalah, the Christian Bible and Anthropology and the History of the Middle East.

In 1977 he gained a scholarship in Florence from the Italian government to investigate Renaissance humanism of the work of Giovanni Pico della Mirandola.

In 1978 while living in Barcelona he obtained Spanish citizenship and graduated in Hispanic Studies. Besides writing a dozen essays, he is the author of several books of poems. He currently lives in Spain.

Books of poetry 

"Los cuatro elementos" (1964) 
"Hoja de ruta" (1966) 
"Las frutas" (1970) 
"Quintaesencia" (1974) 
"Los peces, los pájaros, las flores" (1975) 
"Canon de polen" (1976)
"Las redes cristalinas" (1985)
"Enseñanzas de una Lágrima" (2001)

Novels 

"Sol, Luna, Tierra, Marte"
"La fabulosa historia de Kallima y el árbol que canta"
"Mercurio"
"Vidas paralelas"

Essays 
"El fruto más espléndido del Árbol de la Kábala"
"Qué es la Kábala"
"Jesús el Nazareno : terapeuta y kabalista"
"El Cantar de los Cantares : los aromas del amor"
"Los alumbrados"
"Las vocales de la risa, risoterapia y cultura"
Umbría lumbre : San Juan de la Cruz y sabiduría secreta en la Kábala y el Sufismo"
Introducción a la kábala"
Senderos en el jardín del corazón : poética de la kábala"
El judaísmo : 4000 años de cultura"

External links 
Website of Mario Satz
Search/Búsqueda en español del catálogo ISBN

1944 births
Living people
Argentine essayists
Argentine male poets
Argentine male novelists
Jewish Argentine writers
Spanish poets
Spanish essayists
Spanish novelists
People from Coronel Pringles
20th-century Argentine poets
20th-century Spanish male writers
21st-century Argentine poets
21st-century Argentine male writers
20th-century essayists
21st-century essayists